The 2007 NBA All-Star Game was an exhibition basketball game that was played on February 18, 2007, during the National Basketball Association's (NBA) 2006–07 season. It was the 56th edition of the NBA All-Star Game, and was played at the University of Nevada, Las Vegas's Thomas & Mack Center in Paradise, Nevada. The Western Conference defeated the Eastern Conference, 153–132. Kobe Bryant was named the All-Star Game Most Valuable Player (MVP), having recorded 31 points, 5 rebounds, 6 assists, and 6 steals. It was the first time the All-Star Game was played in a city without an NBA franchise and first to be played on a college campus. The game was nationally televised on TNT in the United States at 9 p.m. ET as part of the NBA on TNT coverage.

The Western Conference set All-Star records with 69 field goals and 52 assists. Amar'e Stoudemire scored 29 points with nine rebounds, and Carmelo Anthony had 20 points and nine rebounds for the West. LeBron James led the Eastern Conference with 28 points, six rebounds, and six assists, and Dwight Howard tallied 20 points and 12 boards. Bryant, previously the MVP of the 2002 All-Star Game, moved from 11th to 10th place on all-time All-star scoring, surpassing Magic Johnson. Dirk Nowitzki became the first European born-player to be a starter at the All-Star Game.

As announced on August 5, 2005, the NBA, led by Commissioner David Stern, did not allow wagering on the results of the game in the state of Nevada.

Venues 
The choice to choose Las Vegas as the location was widely regarded as a bid by the city to give it its first major sports franchise. Mayor Oscar Goodman met with David Stern to discuss the possibility during the events. On April 5, Goodman sent a letter to the commissioner, requesting a meeting to sort out the matter. All-Star MVP and former teammates Kobe Bryant and Shaquille O'Neal welcomed the possibility, amid the gambling.

All-Star Game

Coaches

The coach whose team has the best record in its conference is granted the right to coach their team. However, despite this rule, no one is allowed to coach in three consecutive All-Star Games. The Dallas Mavericks' Avery Johnson, who coached the West last year, fell under this rule so Mike D'Antoni of the Phoenix Suns took his place.  The East's coach was Eddie Jordan of the Washington Wizards, as Flip Saunders was ineligible due to coaching the East last year.

Players

The 2006 All-Star MVP LeBron James was the top vote-getter, receiving 2,516,049 votes for the Eastern Conference's small forward position. One player has received more votes in NBA history: Dwight Howard with 3,150,181. Three other players, guards Kobe Bryant of the Lakers and Dwyane Wade of the Miami Heat and center Yao of the Houston Rockets, received more than two million votes. All three started at their positions in their respective conference—with the exception of Yao Ming due to injury.

In the Western Conference, the race was tight. Allen Iverson, formerly the seven-time East point guard starter, moved to Denver from Philadelphia, attracting votes from reigning NBA MVP Steve Nash. But surprisingly, neither of the two was voted in; both were reserves as swingman Tracy McGrady came in the back door win. Dirk Nowitzki, another player who analysts predicted that would be starting, was not able to muster enough votes to get over former MVP Kevin Garnett's 1,600,000, but was put in by coaches as a reserve and later added to the starting lineup by West coach Mike D'Antoni. Tim Duncan was also voted in as a forward. Carmelo Anthony, the star small forward for the Nuggets, was not voted in as a starter or reserve, contrary to earlier reports that head coaches from the conference would put him in the lineup despite being involved in a brawl, but was allowed as a reserve (because Carlos Boozer was injured). Mehmet Okur of the Utah Jazz and Ray Allen of the Seattle SuperSonics were chosen by Stern to replace the injured Nash and Iverson.

Gilbert Arenas of the East benefited from Iverson's move to the West. In one of the closest races in game history, Arenas gained enough calls to start as the point guard of the East, over the New Jersey Nets' Vince Carter. Carter was eventually named as a reserve along with teammate Jason Kidd. In a controversial race, Shaquille O'Neal was voted in as starting center for the 14th straight time (despite playing only four games up to that point) over young star Dwight Howard. Chris Bosh of the Toronto Raptors was voted by the fans to start, marking the first time a Raptor started since Vince Carter was the top vote getter in his last season in Toronto.

Roster
Appearance denotes the number of times the player been selected to play in the All-Star game, including 2007. Jason Kidd of the East and Carlos Boozer, Steve Nash, Allen Iverson, and Yao Ming of the West could not play due to injuries. The game featured seven first time All-Stars.

Game

Unable to participate due to injury.  Nowitzki was named to the starting lineup in place of Yao.
Named to team by commissioner David Stern as replacement for injured player.

All-Star Weekend

T-Mobile Rookie Challenge 

David Lee hit all 14 of his field-goal attempts for a game-high 30 points as the Sophomore beat the Rookies for the fifth consecutive year, 155–114. Lee, who added 11 rebounds and four assists, took home MVP of the 2007 Rookie Challenge.

Chris Paul notched novice-game records of 17 assists and nine steals to go with 16 points. Monta Ellis was the beneficiary of many of Paul's assists, as he had 5 alley-oop dunks in a 3:25 span, en route to scoring 28 points. Rudy Gay and Paul Millsap paced the Rookie squad with 22 points apiece.

This game set a number of records for the Rookie Challenge:
 Highest scoring half: 78 points (Sophomores 2nd Half)
 Chris Paul's 17 assist and nine steals

The coaches of the game were Mike O'Koren (Assistant coach of the Washington Wizards) for the Rookie Team, and Marc Iavaroni (Assistant coach of the Phoenix Suns) for the Sophomore team.

Foot Locker Three-Point Shootout 

Jason Kapono tied Mark Price's final-round record with 24 points and outlasted Gilbert Arenas on his way to the 2007 Foot Locker Three-Point Shootout title. Arenas notched a first-round high of 23 points and had 17 in the finals. Defending champion Dirk Nowitzki had 20 in round one and nine in the finals, and Kapono narrowly made the finals with a first-round score of 19. Mike Miller (18), Damon Jones (15) and Jason Terry (10) were eliminated early.

Slam Dunk Contest 
The Sprite Slam Dunk Contest was a memorable one. Dwight Howard jumped up and dunked while posting a sticker of him laughing, on the backboard. Eventually, Gerald Green and Nate Robinson went to the final round. Robinson looked unimpressive with his first dunk, and Green looked as bad as Robinson. However, Robinson had to do his second dunk after the limited two-minute period, and scored below 40. Green finished it off by getting a perfect score after jumping over a table.  The judging panel included an impressive list of former champions who are considered some of the greatest dunkers in NBA history: Michael Jordan, Dominique Wilkins, Julius Erving, Kobe Bryant and Vince Carter.

PlayStation Skills Challenge 

Unable to participate due to injury.
Named as replacement for injured player.

Result 

Dwyane Wade won his second straight Skills Challenge.

Haier Shooting Stars Competition 

The San Antonio team tried to be the first team to win back-to-back titles. Team Chicago (48.8) and Team Detroit (1:06) advanced to final round. Due to Ben Gordon shooting out of order before Candice Dupree, Detroit won by default.

Schedule
 February 15–19: NBA Jam Session
 Friday, February 16: NBA All-Star Celebrity Game
 Friday, February 16: 2007 Rookie Challenge
 Saturday, February 17: 1st Annual D-League All-Star Game
 Saturday, February 17: NBA All-Star Saturday (Slam Dunk Contest, Three-Point Shootout, Shooting Stars Competition, Skills Challenge)
 Sunday, February 18:  56th Annual NBA All-Star Game

References

External links
NBA.com: All-Star 2007

National Basketball Association All-Star Game
All-Star Game
NBA All-Star Game, 2007
Events in Paradise, Nevada
2007 in sports in Nevada
21st century in Las Vegas